The 1984 United States Senate election in Oregon took place on November 6, 1984. Incumbent Republican U.S. Senator Mark Hatfield was re-elected to a fourth term in office, defeating Democratic State Senator Margie Hendriksen. As of 2022, this is the last U.S. Senate race in Oregon where every county voted for the same candidate.

Republican primary

Candidates
 Mark Hatfield, incumbent Senator
 Ralph H. Preston
 Sherry Reynolds
 John T. Schiess

Results

Democratic primary

Candidates
 Margie Hendriksen, State Senator from Portland
 Sam Kahl

Results

General election

Results

See also 
 1984 United States Senate elections

References

1984
Oregon
United States Senate